Charles or Charlie Walker may refer to:

Politics
 Charles Walker (Fijian politician) (1928–2021), Fijian civil servant, politician and diplomat
 Charles Walker (Georgia politician) (born 1947), American politician
 Charles Walker (British politician) (born 1967), Conservative Party politician
 Charls Walker (1923–2015), Under Secretary and Deputy Secretary of the US Treasury
 Charles C. B. Walker (1824–1888), New York U.S. Representative
 Charles Rumford Walker (physician) (1852–1922), New Hampshire State Legislature 
 Charles E. Walker (1860–1893), New York State Senate politician
 Charles H. Walker (1828–1877), Wisconsin State Assembly
 Charles Arthur Walker, Member of the UK Parliament for Wexford Borough

Religion
 Charles L. Walker (1832–1904), Latter-day Saint hymn writer
 Charles Curwen Walker (1856–1940), Christadelphian writer and editor
 Charles Coates Walker (1920–2004), American Quaker activist
 Charles Walker (liturgist) (died 1887), liturgist and author
 Charlie Cytron-Walker, American rabbi

Sports
 Charles Walker (cricketer, born 1851) (1851–1915), English cricketer
 Charlie Walker (Australian cricketer) (Charles William Walker, 1909–1942), Australian wicket-keeper
 Charlie Walker (English cricketer) (born 1992), English cricketer, plays for Oxford MCCU and for Herefordshire
 Charlie Walker (footballer, born 1911) (1911–1990), English football player
 Charlie Walker (footballer, born 1990), English football player for Aldershot Town
 Charlie Walker (rugby union) (born 1992), English rugby player with Harlequin F.C.
 Chuck Walker (Charles David Walker, born 1941), American football player
 Chuck Walker (boxer) (born 1957), American boxer

Other
 Charles Vincent Walker (1812–1882), British electrical engineer
 Charles Pyndar Beauchamp Walker (1817–1894), British Army general
 Charles Howard Walker (1857–1936), American architect
 Charles Rumford Walker (1893–1974), American historian
 Charlie Walker (musician) (1926–2008), American country musician
 Charles Walker (checkers player) (born 1934), Mississippi state checkers champion
 Charles Walker (murderer) (1940–1990), convicted murderer and first man to be executed in Illinois after capital punishment was reinstated
 Charles D. Walker (born 1948), American astronaut
 Charles F. Walker, Latin American historian
 Charles "Charlie" Walker, fictional character in Scream 4 (2011)
 Sir Roland Walker (Charles Roland Vincent Walker, born 1970), British Army general